Jennifer Anson (born March 5, 1977 in New York City, United States) is an American-Palaun judoka.

At the 2012 Summer Olympics Jennifer Anson competed in the Women's 63 kg, but was quickly defeated in the initial elimination round of 32.  Anson was on her back and out almost as soon as her first fight had started, overwhelmed by a far superior and younger Mongolian opponent, Munkhzaya Tsedevsuren. In only 46 seconds, the 26-year-old Mongolian pummeled and strangled Anson resulting in an Ippon, or technical knockout, and a perfect score of 110 to 0, the highest possible score in judo. The strangling technique used is called okuri eri jime.

The bout has been described as a cameo Olympic appearance for Anson that ended in a flash.  The 46 second round was the shortest contest in the elimination round of 32 which entitled Anson to be one of London 2012's "unusual athletes". After the match, Anson stated that, "when I was out there, everything blacked out in my head" and the fight was over before she could think of what to do.  It is unclear if this was the result of the strangling or a panicked athlete, but Anson did say that, “when the fight started, I forgot everything. I wanted to be defensive-minded but still trying to be aggressive. All of sudden I was on the mat and the fight was lost.”

Anson's quick defeat is attributed to her inexperience as she filled a quota slot for Oceania after finishing 86th out of 178 places. At 35 years, she was also the oldest competitor among the 24 contestants in the 63k category, followed by 33-year-old Elisabeth Willeboordse of the Netherlands. The majority of the Olympic athletes were in their 20s.  After the stunning length of the fight, Anson explained that she intended to set an example for younger members of her judo club in Palau of which there are 10 members with 40 kids learning the sport.

References

External links
 

1977 births
Living people
Sportspeople from New York City
Palauan female judoka
American female judoka
Olympic judoka of Palau
Judoka at the 2012 Summer Olympics